KMUL (830 AM) was a radio station  broadcasting an oldies format. Formerly licensed to Farwell, Texas, United States, the station served the Clovis NM and Muleshoe Texas areas.  The station was owned by Tallgrass Broadcasting.

History
The station went on the air as KLZK on 14 June 1991.  On 1  April 1993, the station changed its call sign to KMUL.

KMUL's owners surrendered the station's license to the Federal Communications Commission on September 30, 2013. The FCC cancelled the license on March 12, 2014.

References

External links

MUL
Defunct radio stations in the United States
Radio stations disestablished in 2014
1991 establishments in Texas
2014 disestablishments in Texas
Radio stations established in 1991
MUL
Parmer County, Texas